The 1990 United States Senate election in Massachusetts was held on November 6, 1990. Incumbent Democratic U.S. Senator John Kerry was reelected to his second term.

Republican primary

Candidates 
 Jim Rappaport, real estate developer
 Daniel W. Daly, former Massachusetts Undersecretary of Economic Affairs

Results

General election

Candidates 
 John Kerry (D), incumbent U.S. Senator
 Jim Rappaport (R), real estate developer

Results

See also 
 1990 United States Senate elections

References 

Massachusetts
John Kerry
1990
1990 Massachusetts elections